Bazerjan (also Romanized as Bāzarjān and Bāzerjān; also known as Bāzrijān) is a village in Bazarjan Rural District, in the Central District of Tafresh County, Markazi Province, Iran. At the 2006 census, its population was 136, in 48 families.

See also 

Borzeh, a mountain near Bazarjan

References 

Populated places in Tafresh County